"For the Girl who Has Everything" is the twelfth episode of the 1969 ITC British television series Randall and Hopkirk (Deceased) starring Mike Pratt, Kenneth Cope and Annette Andre. The episode was first broadcast on 6 December 1969 on ITV. Directed by Cyril Frankel, it featured Lois Maxwell.

Synopsis
Kim Wentworth (Lois Maxwell) has too much money, and too many husbands, plots to kill husband seven for artistic straying, with a cover of a haunting - being investigated by ghost hunter James McAlliser (Freddie Jones) for a fee of £1500 (1969 - £25,000 2020). Apparently dodgy McAlliser is quite the reverse, calling on Randall and Hopkirk when he cannot detect a ghost, and generously shares his fee with Randall for a week's work. Randall is left to sort out the true killer of McAllister, husband number 7 and becoming murder victim no 3 of the episode. A nice aside is meeting Mrs Pleasance (Marjorie Rhodes) a modest born clairvoyant for far too short a time, whose storyline intersects with the murders for humour and resolution.

Cast
Mike Pratt as Jeff Randall
Kenneth Cope as Marty Hopkirk
Annette Andre as Jeannie Hopkirk
Lois Maxwell as Kim Wentworth
Marjorie Rhodes as Mrs. Pleasance
Freddie Jones as James McAllister
Michael Coles as Larry Wentworth
Paul Bertoya as Jean-Claude
Carol Cleveland as Laura Slade
Eric Dodson as Vicar
Carol Dilworth as Girl with Dog
George Lee as Police Sergeant
Basil Clarke as Coroner

Production
The exterior to Kim Wentworth's home was shot at Hilfield Castle in Aldenham, Hertfordshire. The village scenes and tea shop exterior were shot at The Buttery on Village Road in Denham, Buckinghamshire. Laura Slade's cottage was shot on Slade Oak Lane, also in Denham. The episode was actually the third episode to be shot, shot in June–July 1968.

The following is an extract from Dennis Spooner's actual script outline for the scene and aftermath in which Marty discovers somebody other than Randall who can see him:

Freddie Jones is seen riding a 1963 Triumph tiger cub in the opening seconds of the episode.

References

External links

Episode overview at Randallandhopkirk.org.uk
Filming locations  at Randallandhopkirk.org.uk

Randall and Hopkirk (Deceased) episodes
1969 British television episodes